Scrobipalpa ustulatella is a moth in the family Gelechiidae. It was described by Otto Staudinger in 1871. It is found in south-western Russia and Ukraine.

The ground colour of the forewings is violet-grey densely sprinkled with black scales. The hindwings are lighter grey.

References

Scrobipalpa
Moths described in 1871